Thiruselvam Velusamy known professionally as V. Thiruselvam is an Indian Tamil Television director and Actor. Thiruselvam is best known for director and playing the role of 'Tholkapian' in the Tamil-language Family television series Kolangal, where he played a good friend of the heroine Abinaya.

Personal life
Thiruselvam was born in an agricultural family and is from Peravurani in Thanjavur district. He is married to Bharathy, who is a civil engineer working for a construction company.

Career
Thiruselvam started his cinema career as an assistant director & co-director to Television director Thirumurugan in serials like Kaveri & Metti Oli. That's when the director offered him a role in his serial Metti Oli making his acting debut. Later he made his writing & directorial debut in Kolangal along with playing the male lead. The show ran for more than 6 years and had more than a 1533 episodes. He went on to writer and direct two other series 'Alli Rajiyam' (2005-2006) and Madhavi (2009-2011) for Sun TV.

During early 2012, Thiruselvam making his debut as a Television producer in 'Pokkisham' serial, That serial aired on Kalaignar TV from 2012 to 2013. He also played the role of the lead actor. In 2013 Writer and director another serial Chithiram pesuthadi in 2015 Kairasi Kudumbam for Jaya TV.

He also writes and screenplay the Vikatan TV YouTube channel's drama, 'Vallamai Tharayo' in 2021. It was India's first digital daily. series He had another breakthrough in 2022 by Sun TV's serial Ethirneechal.

Television

Awards and nominations

References

External links 
 

Living people
Television personalities from Tamil Nadu
21st-century Tamil male actors
21st-century Indian film directors
Tamil male television actors
Year of birth missing (living people)
Tamil television directors
Tamil television producers
Tamil television writers